Barvitius is a surname. Notable people with the surname include:

Antonín Viktor Barvitius (1823–1901), Czech architect
Karel Barvitius (1864–1937), Czech publisher of books and music
Viktor Barvitius (1834–1902), Czech painter

See also
Barvitus (fl. 545), Scottish saint